40 BunarFest  is an annual non traditional festival of alternative sport held in Prizren, a city in southern Kosovo, and it is organized by Shoqni e Sportistve t'kfillt ("Society of Sober Sportsmen").
It features rafting through the Lumbardhi (Prizrenska Bistrica) river using tractor-tire inner tubes. The year 2008 saw the fourth edition of the festival with nearly 70 participants in the race, during the day of festival various DJ-s performed in the center of Prizren. The festival also publishes a comic book every year when it's held, subject of the book changes every year and it includes various persona from the old urban legends of Prizren.

Winners of 40 Bunar Fest

See also
 Albanian comics
 Albanian rock
 Culture in Prizren
 Prizren

References

External links
 Bunar Fest website
 40 Bunar Fest Facebook Page
 Article from InYourPocket Guide

Festivals in Kosovo
Sport in Kosovo 
Annual events in Albania